Kunduchi (Magofu ya mji wa kale wa Kunduchi in Swahili )  is a Medieval Swahili historic site in Kunduchi ward, located in Kinondoni District of Dar es Salaam Region. There is an excavated 15th-century mosque on the site.
An 18th-century cemetery with the biggest collection of pillared tombs in East Africa, situated in a baobab woodland, and embellished with Ming era's porcelain plates. The pottery discovered here demonstrates the medieval town's affluence and trading connections with imperial China.

See also
Historic Swahili Settlements

References

Swahili people
Swahili city-states
Swahili culture